Malnava Parish is an administrative territorial entity of Ludza Municipality in the Latgale region of Latvia. Prior to the 2009 administrative reforms it was part of the former Ludza District.

Towns, villages and settlements of Malnava Parish 
 Malnava - parish administrative center
 Grebņova

See also 
Malnava Manor

References 

Parishes of Latvia
Ludza Municipality
Latgale